Diptyque : essai sur la vie terrestre et l'éternité bienheureuse is a piece for organ by French composer Olivier Messiaen.

Background 

Messiaen became acquainted of Charles Quef, the then organist at the Trinité in Paris, in autumn 1929, which led him to give two small organ recitals in Tencin, just at the north-east of Grenoble. These were Messiaen's first organ recitals, which took place on September 15 and 22, 1929. The Diptyque was dedicated to two of the most influential composers and teachers of Messiaen: Marcel Dupré and Paul Dukas. It was premiered by Messiaen himself in a concert for Les Amis de l'Orgue on February 20, 1930, at the Sainte-Trinité, Paris. It immediately caught the attention of fellow musicians and was published shortly after that, in May 1930, by Éditions Durand, followed by some of his other compositions (the Préludes were released in June and the Trois Mélodies in October). It was the only piece for pipe organ written by Messiaen published by Durand. 

Messiaen later became critical of his own earlier style. In an interview with Karin Ernst held on October 24, 1977, Messiaen referred to the Diptyque as a "sin" of his youth.

Structure 

The Diptyque is in one movement, in two thematically related sections. Being a diptyque, the first section - at under 5 minutes (following the metronome mark) - is matched by the second section also taking a little under 5 minutes. It is scored for solo pipe organ, requiring 2 manuals and pedals. (The second section also needs an organ keyboard of 61 notes (with a top C) unless one can engineer differing octaves through deployment of higher stops.) It is also worth noting that there are inconsistencies, errors or questionable notes (evidenced by redundant accidentals and parallel passages later) in bars 16, 18, 22, 28, 48, 50, 52, 76, 91, 95.

The first section is a fast-moving prelude with a repeating seven-note motif. It is marked "Modéré" and is in the key of C minor. Unlike Messiaen's later style, neither the tempo nor the time signature present any changes in this section. The first section is meant to express "the anguish and useless torment of life". According to Messiaen, it is "an adagio in C major, based on a single serene ascending phrase", which "expresses the peace and charity of Christian paradise".

The second section of the Diptyque was rearranged for violin and piano for the last movement in Messiaen's Quatuor pour la fin du temps. However, Messiaen decided to use a much slower tempo on Quatuor: he marked it "extrêment lent" and slowed it down to ♪ = 36, much slower than the ♪ = 58 marked on Diptyque.

References 

1930 compositions
Compositions by Olivier Messiaen
Compositions for organ